The Cannone-Mitragliera da 20/77 (Scotti) was a 20 mm anti-aircraft gun produced by the Scotti company in Italy, used in World War II, firing a  20x138mmB cartridge.

History 
The Italian army had two standard 20 mm anti-aircraft weapons during World War II. One was the Breda and the other was the Cannone-Mitragliera da 20/77 (Scotti) which was first designed in 1932 and produced by the Swiss Oerlikon company. They originally used a 60-round drum that was eventually discarded in favor of 12 round trays for the ammunition. Compared to the Breda, the Scotti was a far simpler weapon. It resembled the Oerlikon in some respects, but used a different mechanism. The Scotti was easier to manufacture than the Breda, but despite using a longer barrel, the Scotti's overall performance was inferior. The same ammunition type was used, but, based on the lower effective ceiling, with a different propellant charge. To balance this, when used against targets at low altitude, the rate of fire was slightly higher and, for the benefit of the crew, the Scotti was made lighter.

The Scotti was used in smaller numbers than the Breda, but by many other nations, such as China and many of the South American countries. After 1942, the ease of fabrication led to an increase in production totals, but the type never seriously challenged the number of Bredas in service. Before 1943, many Scottis were used by German troops in North Africa as the 2-cm Scotti (i), and once the Italians surrendered, the Scotti became an established part of the German inventory. It was used by the Germans operating against the Yugoslav partisans. Two versions of the Scotti were produced; one, a semi-mobile version that could be carried on trucks and dismounted for use; the other, a fixed version used for defense. Once off the trucks, the first version could be manhandled into position on its two-wheel carriage, although in action the gun rested on a flat tripod mounting. The second version was static on a pedestal mount, and was mainly used in defense of the Italian homeland. A number of these were taken over by British troops for local defence of coastal artillery positions. After 1945, the Scotti was used for a number of years by the reconstituted Italian army.

Notes

References
 Bishop, Chris, The Encyclopedia of Weapons of World War II, Metro Books, 1998, 
 

World War II weapons of Italy
World War II anti-aircraft guns
Anti-aircraft guns of Italy
World War II artillery of Italy
20 mm artillery
Military equipment introduced in the 1930s